Amblyseius channabasavannai is a species of mite in the family Phytoseiidae.

References

channabasavannai
Articles created by Qbugbot
Animals described in 1978